The Zhejiang Provincial Museum (浙江省博物馆) is the provincial museum of Zhejiang, China, located in Hangzhou. It was established in 1929 as the West Lake Museum on the Gushan Island in the West Lake. It houses over 100,000 items in its permanent collection. On 22 December 2009, a new building was inaugurated on the West Lake Cultural Square near the Wulin Square, next to the Grand Canal. It has  of display space, twice as much as the Gushan building.

See also
 List of museums in China

References

External links
Official website

Museums established in 1929
Museums in Hangzhou
National first-grade museums of China
1929 establishments in China
2009 establishments in China